Ingemar Wikström is a male former international table tennis player for Sweden.

Table tennis career
He won a gold medal in the Swaythling Cup (men's team event) at the 1973 World Table Tennis Championships as part of the Sweden team that contained Anders Johansson, Kjell Johansson, Stellan Bengtsson and Bo Persson.

Two years later he won a bronze medal at the 1975 World Table Tennis Championships in the Swaythling Cup (men's team event).

He also won three medals in the European Table Tennis Championships.

See also
 List of table tennis players
 List of World Table Tennis Championships medalists

References

Swedish male table tennis players
World Table Tennis Championships medalists